The 1969 Montreal Expos season was the inaugural season in Major League Baseball for the team. The Expos, as typical for first-year expansion teams, finished in the cellar of the National League East Division with a 52–110 record, 48 games behind the eventual World Series Champion New York Mets.  They did not win any game in extra innings during the year, which also featured a surprise no-hitter in just the ninth regular-season game they ever played. Their home attendance of 1,212,608, an average of 14,970 per game, was good for 7th in the N.L.

Offseason

Expansion draft 

The Montreal Expos participated in the 1968 Major League Baseball expansion draft on October 14, 1968.

Other transactions 
 October 16, 1968: Don Bosch was purchased by the Expos from the New York Mets.
 October 21, 1968: Bob Bailey was purchased by the Expos from the Los Angeles Dodgers.
 December 2, 1968: Floyd Wicker was drafted by the Expos from the St. Louis Cardinals in the 1968 rule 5 draft.
 January 22, 1969: Donn Clendenon and Jesús Alou were traded by the Expos to the Houston Astros for Rusty Staub. Clendenon refused to report to his new team. The Expos sent Jack Billingham, Skip Guinn, and $100,000 to the Astros on April 8 as compensation.

1968 MLB June amateur draft 
The Expos and San Diego Padres, along with the two American League expansion teams set to debut in 1969, the Kansas City Royals and Seattle Pilots, were allowed to participate in the June 1968 MLB first-year player draft, although the new teams were barred from the lottery's first three rounds. The Expos drafted only 15 players in the 1968 June draft, and none reached the major leagues. All but five went unsigned.

Spring training
The Expos held spring training at West Palm Beach Municipal Stadium in West Palm Beach, Florida, a facility they shared with the Atlanta Braves. It was destined to become their long-time spring training home: they trained there through 1972 and from 1981 through 1997.

Regular season

Milestones 
First international game in MLB history
First hit and extra-base hit in franchise history: Bob Bailey, a double in the first inning
First home run: relief pitcher Dan McGinn, a two-run shot off future Baseball Hall of Famer Tom Seaver in the fourth

Scorecard 
April 8, Shea Stadium, New York City, New York

Opening Day Lineup

Others 
 April 14, 1969: Mack Jones hit a three-run home run and two-run triple that highlighted an 8–7 win over the St. Louis Cardinals in the Expos' first home victory as a franchise at Jarry Park. Jones' blast was also the first MLB home run hit outside the United States. Dan McGinn became the first MLB pitcher to win a game outside the United States.
 April 17, 1969: In just the franchise's ninth game in existence, Bill Stoneman pitched a 7–0 no-hitter while striking out 8 batters against the Philadelphia Phillies at Connie Mack Stadium. Johnny Briggs made the final out for the Phillies. Le Grand Orange Rusty Staub was the hitting hero for the Expos going 4 for 5 with three doubles and a homer. A crowd of 6,496 were on hand to see it in Philadelphia.  Stoneman pitched another 7–0 no-hitter in 1972, against the New York Mets in Jarry Park on October 2.

Season standings

Record vs. opponents

Notable transactions 
 April 27, 1969: Roy Face was signed as a free agent by the Expos.
 June 3, 1969: Mudcat Grant was traded by the Expos to the St. Louis Cardinals for Gary Waslewski.
 June 11, 1969: Maury Wills and Manny Mota were traded by the Expos  to the Los Angeles Dodgers for Ron Fairly and Paul Popovich.
 June 11, 1969: Paul Popovich was traded by the Expos to the Chicago Cubs for Adolfo Phillips and Jack Lamabe.
 June 15, 1969: Donn Clendenon was traded by the Expos to the New York Mets for Kevin Collins, Steve Renko, Bill Carden (minors) and Dave Colon (minors).
 August 15, 1969: Roy Face was released by the Expos.
 August 19, 1969: Claude Raymond was purchased by the Expos from the Atlanta Braves.
 September 13, 1969: Marv Staehle was purchased by the Expos from the Seattle Pilots.

Draft picks
 June 5, 1969: Terry Humphrey was drafted by the Expos in the 39th round of the 1969 Major League Baseball draft.

Roster

Player stats

Batting

Starters by position 
Note: Pos = Position; G = Games played; AB = At bats; R = Runs scored; H = Hits; Avg. = Batting average; HR = Home runs; RBI = Runs batted in; SB = Stolen bases

Other batters 
Note: G = Games played; AB = At bats; R = Runs scored; H = Hits; Avg. = Batting average; HR = Home runs; RBI = Runs batted in; SB = Stolen bases

Pitching

Starting pitchers 
Note: G = Games pitched; IP = Innings pitched; W = Wins; L = Losses; ERA = Earned run average; SO = Strikeouts

Other pitchers 
Note: G = Games pitched; IP = Innings pitched; W = Wins; L = Losses; ERA = Earned run average; SO = Strikeouts

Relief pitchers 
Note: G = Games pitched; W = Wins; L = Losses; SV = Saves; ERA = Earned run average; SO = Strikeouts

Awards and honors 

1969 Major League Baseball All-Star Game
 Rusty Staub, reserve

Farm system

Notes

References 

 1969 Montreal Expos at Baseball Reference
 1969 Montreal Expos at Baseball Almanac
 

Montreal Expos seasons
Montreal Expos season
Inaugural Major League Baseball seasons by team
1960s in Montreal
1969 in Quebec